A resort village is a type of incorporated urban municipality in the Canadian province of Saskatchewan. A resort village is created from an organized hamlet by the Minister of Municipal Affairs by ministerial order via section 51 of The Municipalities Act if the community has:
been an organized hamlet for three or more years;
a population of 100 or more;
50 or more dwellings or businesses; and
a taxable assessment base that meets a prescribed minimum.

Saskatchewan has 40 resort villages that had a cumulative population of 4,118 and an average population of 103 in the 2011 Census. Saskatchewan's largest and smallest resort villages are Candle Lake and the Lumsden Beach with populations of 765 and 10 respectively. 

A resort village council may request the Minister of Municipal Affairs to change its status to a town if the resort village has a population of 500 or more. 


List

Gallery

See also
List of communities in Saskatchewan
List of municipalities in Saskatchewan

References

Resort villages